Donegal Airport  is located  south-west of Bunbeg in Carrickfinn, a townland in The Rosses, a district in north-west County Donegal, Ireland. The airport is on the county's north-west coast. about a 15-minute drive from Dungloe and Gweedore and 45 minutes from Letterkenny. It is popularly known within County Donegal as Carrickfinn Airport.

History

20th century
Until the mid-1980s, the runway was a grass strip. This was replaced by a hard surface runway with temporary buildings. The airport started operations in 1986 and was developed with funds and assistance from the Government of Ireland, private investors, Donegal County Council, the International Fund for Ireland and the European Regional Development Fund.

2000s
On 21 February 2007, the Irish Government announced that it would be giving €3.8 million to the airport in capital grant money. Domestic service to Dublin was established by Aer Arann. Aer Arann operated flights to Cork via Dublin in 2009 until they reduced their Cork-Dublin service to six times per week. The route closed in March 2010. In February 2010, Aer Arann closed its service to Glasgow Prestwick Airport and relocated to Glasgow Int’l Airport.

Late 2000s and early 2010s, CityJet operated a Saturday seasonal charter flight to Rotterdam between April and September using a Fokker 50.

2010s
Service to Dublin was operated from 2012 to 2015 by Loganair and Flybe using a Saab 340 which rotated via Glasgow to provide aircraft and crew replenishment. Stobart Air, operating as Aer Lingus Regional, received public service obligation funding from the Irish Government to subsidise the route to Dublin. A contract was awarded in 2014, and the service commenced on 1 March 2015, using an ATR 42-300 (reg nos. EI-CBK or EI-EHH). The service was operated using an ATR 42-600 (reg nos. EI-GEV) from 2018 until the demise of Stobart Air, in June 2021.

2020s 
In July 2021, Amapola Flyg a Swedish regional airline was awarded the PSO route from Dublin to Donegal, as a temporary measure following the demise of Stobart Air. The contract was awarded for a span of 7 months from July 2021 until February 2022. In March 2022, Emerald Airlines (on behalf of Aer Lingus Regional) began flights to Dublin.

Airlines and destinations

The following airlines operates regular scheduled flights to and from Donegal:

Statistics

Airport data
 Traffic permitted: Instrument flight rules/Visual flight rules
 Strength Pavement Classification Number (PCN): 21/F/B/X/T
 Tower Frequency: 129.80 MHz
 Navigational Aids: Non-directional beacon (NDB) 361 kHz  "CFN", Distance measuring equipment (DME) 110.3 MHz  "IFN", Localizer LLZ 110.3 MHz  "IFN"

Trivia
The airport was voted the world's most scenic landing spot in 2018, 2019, and 2020.

References

External links

 Official website
 
 

Airports in the Republic of Ireland
Transport in County Donegal